Mogersdorf is a town in the district of Jennersdorf in the Austrian state of Burgenland.

Geography
Cadastral communities are Deutsch Minihof, Mogersdorf and Wallendorf.

History
Mogersdorf has a famous place in Austrian history because it was here that Raimondo Montecuccoli annihilated a 60,000/90,000-strong army of the Ottoman Empire in 1664 upon its attempt to cross the Raab River westwards towards Styria. This Battle of Mogersdorf (also known as the First Battle of St. Gotthard) was commemorated by a chapel on the nearby Schlößlberg hill. Having fallen into disrepair, it was replaced by a new building, with an unadorned but huge Christian cross at its side, in 1964.

Population

References

Cities and towns in Jennersdorf District